Alfred Budner (born 30 August 1950) is a Polish politician. He was elected to Sejm on 25 September 2005, getting 16,075 votes in 37 Konin district as a candidate from Samoobrona Rzeczpospolitej Polskiej list.

He was also a member of Sejm 2001-2005.

See also
Members of Polish Sejm 2005-2007

External links
Alfred Budner - parliamentary page – includes declarations of interest, voting record, and transcripts of speeches.

Members of the Polish Sejm 2005–2007
Members of the Polish Sejm 2001–2005
Self-Defence of the Republic of Poland politicians
Polish cooperative organizers
1950 births
Living people
People from Koło County